= Rusalli Chunanagar =

- village
- Location within Madhya Pradesh Location within India
- Coordinates: 23.3729061°N 77.4788014°E
- Country: India
- State: Madhya Pradesh
- District: Bhopal
- Tehsil: Huzur
- Elevation: 482 m (1,581 ft)

Population (2011)
  - Total: 49
- Time zone: UTC+5:30 (IST)
- ISO 3166 code: MP-IN
- 2011 census code: 482413

Rusalli Chunanagar is a village in the Bhopal district of Madhya Pradesh, India. It is located in the Huzur tehsil and the Phanda block.

== Demographics ==
According to the 2011 census of India, Rusalli Chunanagar has 8 households. The effective literacy rate (i.e. the literacy rate of population excluding children aged 6 and below) is 37.5%.

Demographics (2011 Census)
	Total	Male	Female
Population	49	22	27
Children aged below 6 years	9	4	5
Scheduled caste	0	0	0
Scheduled tribe	0	0	0
Literates	15	4	11
Workers (all)	29	17	12
Main workers (total)	24	12	12
Main workers: Cultivators	0	0	0
Main workers: Agricultural labourers	24	12	12
Main workers: Household industry workers	0	0	0
Main workers: Other	0	0	0
Marginal workers (total)	5	5	0
Marginal workers: Cultivators	0	0	0
Marginal workers: Agricultural labourers	5	5	0
Marginal workers: Household industry workers	0	0	0
Marginal workers: Others	0	0	0
Non-workers	20	5	15
